The 1979 VFL season was the 83rd season of the Victorian Football League (VFL), the highest level senior Australian rules football competition in Victoria. The season featured twelve clubs, ran from 31 March until 29 September, and comprised a 22-game home-and-away season followed by a finals series featuring the top five clubs.

The premiership was won by the Carlton Football Club for the twelfth time, after it defeated  by five points in the 1979 VFL Grand Final. 

The season saw the beginning of the league's expansion into the interstate and Sunday television markets, with two Sunday matches played in Sydney, New South Wales.

Night series
 defeated  12.8 (80) to 7.10 (52) in the final.

Premiership season

Round 1

|- bgcolor="#CCCCFF"
| Home team
| Home team score
| Away team
| Away team score
| Venue
| Crowd
| Date
|- bgcolor="#FFFFFF"
| 
| 9.15 (69)
| 
| 21.23 (149)
| Victoria Park
| 29,345
| 7 April 1979
|- bgcolor="#FFFFFF"
| 
| 23.13 (151)
| 
| 15.11 (101)
| Princes Park
| 24,771
| 7 April 1979
|- bgcolor="#FFFFFF"
| 
| 15.21 (111)
| 
| 19.11 (125)
| SMCG
| 18,603
| 7 April 1979
|- bgcolor="#FFFFFF"
| 
| 19.14 (128)
| 
| 14.19 (103)
| Moorabbin Oval
| 22,060
| 7 April 1979
|- bgcolor="#FFFFFF"
| 
| 18.17 (125)
| 
| 16.17 (113)
| MCG
| 24,133
| 7 April 1979
|- bgcolor="#FFFFFF"
| 
| 17.27 (129)
| 
| 16.13 (109)
| NMCG
| 22,633
| 7 April 1979

Round 2

|- bgcolor="#CCCCFF"
| Home team
| Home team score
| Away team
| Away team score
| Venue
| Crowd
| Date
|- bgcolor="#FFFFFF"
| 
| 13.16 (94)
| 
| 20.13 (133)
| Western Oval
| 23,457
| 14 April 1979
|- bgcolor="#FFFFFF"
| 
| 12.14 (86)
| 
| 21.13 (139)
| Junction Oval
| 19,437
| 14 April 1979
|- bgcolor="#FFFFFF"
| 
| 13.24 (102)
| 
| 19.18 (132)
| Princes Park
| 29,355
| 14 April 1979
|- bgcolor="#FFFFFF"
| 
| 15.16 (106)
| 
| 9.13 (67)
| Kardinia Park
| 23,858
| 16 April 1979
|- bgcolor="#FFFFFF"
| 
| 21.22 (148)
| 
| 9.10 (64)
| Windy Hill
| 26,499
| 16 April 1979
|- bgcolor="#FFFFFF"
| 
| 13.18 (96)
| 
| 23.9 (147)
| MCG
| 59,942
| 16 April 1979

Round 3

|- bgcolor="#CCCCFF"
| Home team
| Home team score
| Away team
| Away team score
| Venue
| Crowd
| Date
|- bgcolor="#FFFFFF"
| 
| 11.14 (80)
| 
| 14.17 (101)
| VFL Park
| 41,717
| 31 March 1979
|- bgcolor="#FFFFFF"
| 
| 18.10 (118)
| 
| 16.15 (111)
| SMCG
| 14,431
| 21 April 1979
|- bgcolor="#FFFFFF"
| 
| 18.15 (123)
| 
| 11.17 (83)
| Princes Park
| 14,703
| 21 April 1979
|- bgcolor="#FFFFFF"
| 
| 15.14 (104)
| 
| 16.13 (109)
| Moorabbin Oval
| 18,275
| 21 April 1979
|- bgcolor="#FFFFFF"
| 
| 20.12 (132)
| 
| 16.16 (112)
| MCG
| 24,635
| 21 April 1979
|- bgcolor="#FFFFFF"
| 
| 18.19 (127)
| 
| 14.15 (99)
| NMCG
| 29,747
| 21 April 1979

Despite being formally a part of Round 3, the Essendon vs Carlton match was played as a stand-alone match on the Saturday before Round 1, and was therefore the opening match of the season.

Round 4

Round 5

|- bgcolor="#CCCCFF"
| Home team
| Home team score
| Away team
| Away team score
| Venue
| Crowd
| Date
|- bgcolor="#FFFFFF"
| 
| 19.24 (138)
| 
| 12.16 (88)
| NMCG
| 16,015
| 5 May 1979
|- bgcolor="#FFFFFF"
| 
| 10.16 (76)
| 
| 25.22 (172)
| Windy Hill
| 19,741
| 5 May 1979
|- bgcolor="#FFFFFF"
| 
| 15.20 (110)
| 
| 13.18 (96)
| Princes Park
| 24,248
| 5 May 1979
|- bgcolor="#FFFFFF"
| 
| 11.16 (82)
| 
| 24.17 (161)
| MCG
| 31,448
| 5 May 1979
|- bgcolor="#FFFFFF"
| 
| 17.10 (112)
| 
| 22.10 (142)
| Moorabbin Oval
| 15,481
| 5 May 1979
|- bgcolor="#FFFFFF"
| 
| 12.17 (89)
| 
| 20.17 (137)
| VFL Park
| 34,163
| 5 May 1979

Round 6

|- bgcolor="#CCCCFF"
| Home team
| Home team score
| Away team
| Away team score
| Venue
| Crowd
| Date
|- bgcolor="#FFFFFF"
| 
| 14.15 (99)
| 
| 19.19 (133)
| Victoria Park
| 27,824
| 12 May 1979
|- bgcolor="#FFFFFF"
| 
| 26.19 (175)
| 
| 11.20 (86)
| SMCG
| 12,394
| 12 May 1979
|- bgcolor="#FFFFFF"
| 
| 9.18 (72)
| 
| 7.5 (47)
| Kardinia Park
| 27,824
| 12 May 1979
|- bgcolor="#FFFFFF"
| 
| 21.14 (140)
| 
| 24.19 (163)
| MCG
| 21,783
| 12 May 1979
|- bgcolor="#FFFFFF"
| 
| 16.12 (108)
| 
| 25.18 (168)
| Princes Park
| 29,935
| 12 May 1979
|- bgcolor="#FFFFFF"
| 
| 14.15 (99)
| 
| 13.16 (94)
| VFL Park
| 22,626
| 12 May 1979

Round 7

|- bgcolor="#CCCCFF"
| Home team
| Home team score
| Away team
| Away team score
| Venue
| Crowd
| Date
|- bgcolor="#FFFFFF"
| 
| 22.17 (149)
| 
| 14.17 (101)
| Western Oval
| 15,045
| 19 May 1979
|- bgcolor="#FFFFFF"
| 
| 14.18 (102)
| 
| 11.24 (90)
| Junction Oval
| 15,870
| 19 May 1979
|- bgcolor="#FFFFFF"
| 
| 23.18 (156)
| 
| 9.20 (74)
| Windy Hill
| 21,592
| 19 May 1979
|- bgcolor="#FFFFFF"
| 
| 15.14 (104)
| 
| 16.12 (108)
| Princes Park
| 39,411
| 19 May 1979
|- bgcolor="#FFFFFF"
| 
| 16.15 (111)
| 
| 14.15 (99)
| Moorabbin Oval
| 18,087
| 19 May 1979
|- bgcolor="#FFFFFF"
| 
| 13.14 (92)
| 
| 6.15 (51)
| VFL Park
| 37,260
| 19 May 1979

Round 8

|- bgcolor="#CCCCFF"
| Home team
| Home team score
| Away team
| Away team score
| Venue
| Crowd
| Date
|- bgcolor="#FFFFFF"
| 
| 17.18 (120)
| 
| 10.17 (77)
| Princes Park
| 10,997
| 26 May 1979
|- bgcolor="#FFFFFF"
| 
| 22.26 (158)
| 
| 12.13 (85)
| MCG
| 21,672
| 26 May 1979
|- bgcolor="#FFFFFF"
| 
| 13.16 (94)
| 
| 21.22 (148)
| NMCG
| 17,469
| 26 May 1979
|- bgcolor="#FFFFFF"
| 
| 12.11 (83)
| 
| 12.12 (84)
| Kardinia Park
| 25,402
| 26 May 1979
|- bgcolor="#FFFFFF"
| 
| 6.8 (44)
| 
| 20.11 (131)
| SMCG
| 21,282
| 26 May 1979
|- bgcolor="#FFFFFF"
| 
| 9.10 (64)
| 
| 15.13 (103)
| VFL Park
| 28,817
| 26 May 1979

Round 9

|- bgcolor="#CCCCFF"
| Home team
| Home team score
| Away team
| Away team score
| Venue
| Crowd
| Date
|- bgcolor="#FFFFFF"
| 
| 17.9 (111)
| 
| 23.18 (156)
| MCG
| 23,261
| 2 June 1979
|- bgcolor="#FFFFFF"
| 
| 18.15 (123)
| 
| 11.12 (78)
| Junction Oval
| 14,963
| 2 June 1979
|- bgcolor="#FFFFFF"
| 
| 19.18 (132)
| 
| 10.20 (80)
| Victoria Park
| 31,474
| 2 June 1979
|- bgcolor="#FFFFFF"
| 
| 16.12 (108)
| 
| 17.14 (116)
| Princes Park
| 24,875
| 2 June 1979
|- bgcolor="#FFFFFF"
| 
| 11.12 (78)
| 
| 18.19 (127)
| Western Oval
| 21,362
| 2 June 1979
|- bgcolor="#FFFFFF"
| 
| 18.15 (123)
| 
| 17.8 (110)
| VFL Park
| 15,750
| 2 June 1979

Round 10

|- bgcolor="#CCCCFF"
| Home team
| Home team score
| Away team
| Away team score
| Venue
| Crowd
| Date
|- bgcolor="#FFFFFF"
| 
| 16.19 (115)
| 
| 14.15 (99)
| Windy Hill
| 18,916
| 9 June 1979
|- bgcolor="#FFFFFF"
| 
| 18.15 (123)
| 
| 16.11 (107)
| Princes Park
| 46,106
| 9 June 1979
|- bgcolor="#FFFFFF"
| 
| 9.11 (65)
| 
| 12.13 (85)
| Moorabbin Oval
| 17,390
| 9 June 1979
|- bgcolor="#FFFFFF"
| 
| 14.17 (101)
| 
| 18.19 (127)
| MCG
| 24,824
| 9 June 1979
|- bgcolor="#FFFFFF"
| 
| 11.8 (74)
| 
| 17.17 (119)
| VFL Park
| 14,357
| 9 June 1979
|- bgcolor="#FFFFFF"
| 
| 16.9 (105)
| 
| 23.18 (156)
| SCG
| 31,391
| 10 June 1979

Round 11

|- bgcolor="#CCCCFF"
| Home team
| Home team score
| Away team
| Away team score
| Venue
| Crowd
| Date
|- bgcolor="#FFFFFF"
| 
| 19.18 (132)
| 
| 9.11 (65)
| Junction Oval
| 17,520
| 16 June 1979
|- bgcolor="#FFFFFF"
| 
| 15.10 (100)
| 
| 15.11 (101)
| Princes Park
| 12,513
| 16 June 1979
|- bgcolor="#FFFFFF"
| 
| 11.16 (82)
| 
| 13.18 (96)
| MCG
| 53,562
| 16 June 1979
|- bgcolor="#FFFFFF"
| 
| 15.17 (107)
| 
| 16.14 (110)
| Moorabbin Oval
| 19,705
| 18 June 1979
|- bgcolor="#FFFFFF"
| 
| 18.18 (126)
| 
| 20.12 (132)
| SMCG
| 26,740
| 18 June 1979
|- bgcolor="#FFFFFF"
| 
| 16.12 (108)
| 
|  20.12 (132)
| VFL Park
| 53,116
| 18 June 1979

Round 12

|- bgcolor="#CCCCFF"
| Home team
| Home team score
| Away team
| Away team score
| Venue
| Crowd
| Date
|- bgcolor="#FFFFFF"
| 
| 25.16 (166)
| 
| 16.14 (110)
| MCG
| 21,216
| 23 June 1979
|- bgcolor="#FFFFFF"
| 
| 19.18 (132)
| 
| 13.15 (93)
| Princes Park
| 13,176
| 23 June 1979
|- bgcolor="#FFFFFF"
| 
| 18.12 (120)
| 
| 11.15 (81)
| Western Oval
| 14,308
| 23 June 1979
|- bgcolor="#FFFFFF"
| 
| 15.11 (101)
| 
| 6.18 (54)
| Windy Hill
| 30,795
| 23 June 1979
|- bgcolor="#FFFFFF"
| 
| 15.17 (107)
| 
| 14.17 (101)
| Kardinia Park
| 29,941
| 23 June 1979
|- bgcolor="#FFFFFF"
| 
| 17.20 (122)
| 
| 11.14 (80)
| VFL Park
| 56,975
| 23 June 1979

Round 13

|- bgcolor="#CCCCFF"
| Home team
| Home team score
| Away team
| Away team score
| Venue
| Crowd
| Date
|- bgcolor="#FFFFFF"
| 
| 25.19 (169)
| 
| 8.16 (64)
| Victoria Park
| 22,903
| 30 June 1979
|- bgcolor="#FFFFFF"
| 
| 21.12 (138)
| 
| 12.10 (82)
| Princes Park
| 21,792
| 30 June 1979
|- bgcolor="#FFFFFF"
| 
| 8.21 (69)
| 
| 12.9 (81)
| NMCG
| 13,925
| 30 June 1979
|- bgcolor="#FFFFFF"
| 
| 15.20 (110)
| 
| 20.16 (136)
| SMCG
| 13,850
| 30 June 1979
|- bgcolor="#FFFFFF"
| 
| 9.12 (66)
| 
| 15.15 (105)
| Moorabbin Oval
| 18,802
| 30 June 1979
|- bgcolor="#FFFFFF"
| 
| 9.3 (57)
| 
| 16.12 (108)
| VFL Park
| 13,272
| 30 June 1979

Round 14

|- bgcolor="#CCCCFF"
| Home team
| Home team score
| Away team
| Away team score
| Venue
| Crowd
| Date
|- bgcolor="#FFFFFF"
| 
| 10.11 (71)
| 
| 6.14 (50)
| Windy Hill
| 25,240
| 7 July 1979
|- bgcolor="#FFFFFF"
| 
| 17.18 (120)
| 
| 10.16 (76)
| MCG
| 19,879
| 7 July 1979
|- bgcolor="#FFFFFF"
| 
| 13.11 (89)
| 
| 10.14 (74)
| SMCG
| 10,626
| 7 July 1979
|- bgcolor="#FFFFFF"
| 
| 17.16 (118)
| 
| 14.16 (100)
| NMCG
| 14,971
| 7 July 1979
|- bgcolor="#FFFFFF"
| 
| 6.16 (52)
| 
| 15.11 (101)
| Moorabbin Oval
| 21,588
| 7 July 1979
|- bgcolor="#FFFFFF"
| 
| 17.14 (116)
| 
| 9.11 (65)
| VFL Park
| 58,736
| 7 July 1979

Round 15

|- bgcolor="#CCCCFF"
| Home team
| Home team score
| Away team
| Away team score
| Venue
| Crowd
| Date
|- bgcolor="#FFFFFF"
| 
| 24.23 (167)
| 
| 24.10 (154)
| MCG
| 15,039
| 14 July 1979
|- bgcolor="#FFFFFF"
| 
| 24.16 (160)
| 
| 11.15 (81)
| Western Oval
| 13,386
| 14 July 1979
|- bgcolor="#FFFFFF"
| 
| 10.16 (76)
| 
| 20.13 (133)
| Victoria Park
| 30,415
| 14 July 1979
|- bgcolor="#FFFFFF"
| 
| 18.18 (126)
| 
| 12.11 (83)
| Princes Park
| 44,661
| 14 July 1979
|- bgcolor="#FFFFFF"
| 
| 11.12 (78)
| 
| 11.13 (79)
| VFL Park
| 20,777
| 14 July 1979
|- bgcolor="#FFFFFF"
| 
| 20.15 (135)
| 
| 22.20 (152)
| SCG
| 17,140
| 15 July 1979

Round 16

|- bgcolor="#CCCCFF"
| Home team
| Home team score
| Away team
| Away team score
| Venue
| Crowd
| Date
|- bgcolor="#FFFFFF"
| 
| 14.20 (104)
| 
| 18.11 (119)
| Princes Park
| 13,557
| 21 July 1979
|- bgcolor="#FFFFFF"
| 
| 20.9 (129)
| 
| 14.20 (104)
| Kardinia Park
| 14,613
| 21 July 1979
|- bgcolor="#FFFFFF"
| 
| 23.17 (155)
| 
| 3.15 (33)
| Victoria Park
| 21,041
| 21 July 1979
|- bgcolor="#FFFFFF"
| 
| 16.16 (112)
| 
| 15.9 (99)
| Junction Oval
| 19,684
| 21 July 1979
|- bgcolor="#FFFFFF"
| 
| 9.7 (61)
| 
| 19.26 (140)
| MCG
| 26,388
| 21 July 1979
|- bgcolor="#FFFFFF"
| 
| 8.18 (66)
| 
| 12.16 (88)
| VFL Park
| 14,725
| 21 July 1979

Round 17

|- bgcolor="#CCCCFF"
| Home team
| Home team score
| Away team
| Away team score
| Venue
| Crowd
| Date
|- bgcolor="#FFFFFF"
| 
| 19.14 (128)
| 
| 16.12 (108)
| Moorabbin Oval
| 12,969
| 28 July 1979
|- bgcolor="#FFFFFF"
| 
| 12.10 (82)
| 
| 18.14 (122)
| Western Oval
| 14,284
| 28 July 1979
|- bgcolor="#FFFFFF"
| 
| 15.21 (111)
| 
| 12.11 (83)
| Princes Park
| 22,159
| 28 July 1979
|- bgcolor="#FFFFFF"
| 
| 16.15 (111)
| 
| 19.10 (124)
| MCG
| 38,111
| 28 July 1979
|- bgcolor="#FFFFFF"
| 
| 9.17 (71)
| 
| 14.8 (92)
| Windy Hill
| 31,968
| 28 July 1979
|- bgcolor="#FFFFFF"
| 
| 36.22 (238)
| 
| 6.12 (48)
| VFL Park
| 12,149
| 28 July 1979

Fitzroy's 190 point winning margin is the biggest in AFL/VFL history

Round 18

|- bgcolor="#CCCCFF"
| Home team
| Home team score
| Away team
| Away team score
| Venue
| Crowd
| Date
|- bgcolor="#FFFFFF"
| 
| 31.9 (195)
| 
| 15.16 (106)
| SMCG
| 9,815
| 4 August 1979
|- bgcolor="#FFFFFF"
| 
| 15.14 (104)
| 
| 15.25 (115)
| Princes Park
| 15,104
| 4 August 1979
|- bgcolor="#FFFFFF"
| 
| 21.8 (134)
| 
| 16.9 (105)
| MCG
| 25,367
| 4 August 1979
|- bgcolor="#FFFFFF"
| 
| 18.16 (124)
| 
| 9.9 (63)
| Kardinia Park
| 30,495
| 4 August 1979
|- bgcolor="#FFFFFF"
| 
| 18.11 (119)
| 
| 21.15 (141)
| NMCG
| 28,902
| 4 August 1979
|- bgcolor="#FFFFFF"
| 
| 28.22 (190)
| 
| 18.11 (119)
| VFL Park
| 24,651
| 4 August 1979

Round 19

|- bgcolor="#CCCCFF"
| Home team
| Home team score
| Away team
| Away team score
| Venue
| Crowd
| Date
|- bgcolor="#FFFFFF"
| 
| 13.19 (97)
| 
| 6.5 (41)
| Western Oval
| 12,537
| 11 August 1979
|- bgcolor="#FFFFFF"
| 
| 7.12 (54)
| 
| 17.19 (121)
| Junction Oval
| 16,659
| 11 August 1979
|- bgcolor="#FFFFFF"
| 
| 14.12 (96)
| 
| 8.8 (56)
| Windy Hill
| 23,336
| 11 August 1979
|- bgcolor="#FFFFFF"
| 
| 14.11 (95)
| 
| 13.9 (87)
| Victoria Park
| 18,041
| 11 August 1979
|- bgcolor="#FFFFFF"
| 
| 22.17 (149)
| 
| 6.9 (45)
| Princes Park
| 17,127
| 11 August 1979
|- bgcolor="#FFFFFF"
| 
| 8.25 (73)
| 
| 14.11 (95)
| VFL Park
| 12,897
| 11 August 1979

Round 20

|- bgcolor="#CCCCFF"
| Home team
| Home team score
| Away team
| Away team score
| Venue
| Crowd
| Date
|- bgcolor="#FFFFFF"
| 
| 9.16 (70)
| 
| 10.14 (74)
| Windy Hill
| 19,034
| 18 August 1979
|- bgcolor="#FFFFFF"
| 
| 15.27 (117)
| 
| 6.9 (45)
| NMCG
| 10,680
| 18 August 1979
|- bgcolor="#FFFFFF"
| 
| 16.6 (102)
| 
| 10.12 (72)
| SMCG
| 11,298
| 18 August 1979
|- bgcolor="#FFFFFF"
| 
| 9.6 (60)
| 
| 10.16 (76)
| Moorabbin Oval
| 12,330
| 18 August 1979
|- bgcolor="#FFFFFF"
| 
| 10.15 (75)
| 
| 13.17 (95)
| MCG
| 61,624
| 18 August 1979
|- bgcolor="#FFFFFF"
| 
| 12.18 (90)
| 
| 8.6 (54)
| VFL Park
| 25,075
| 18 August 1979

Round 21

|- bgcolor="#CCCCFF"
| Home team
| Home team score
| Away team
| Away team score
| Venue
| Crowd
| Date
|- bgcolor="#FFFFFF"
| 
| 24.17 (161)
| 
| 12.24 (96)
| MCG
| 18,435
| 25 August 1979
|- bgcolor="#FFFFFF"
| 
| 7.18 (60)
| 
| 24.21 (165)
| Princes Park
| 18,501
| 25 August 1979
|- bgcolor="#FFFFFF"
| 
| 17.13 (115)
| 
| 12.17 (89)
| Kardinia Park
| 18,039
| 25 August 1979
|- bgcolor="#FFFFFF"
| 
| 22.19 (151)
| 
| 14.16 (100)
| Junction Oval
| 12,076
| 25 August 1979
|- bgcolor="#FFFFFF"
| 
| 18.12 (120)
| 
| 14.17 (101)
| Victoria Park
| 36,509
| 25 August 1979
|- bgcolor="#FFFFFF"
| 
| 10.16 (76)
| 
| 13.17 (95)
| VFL Park
| 32,127
| 25 August 1979

Round 22

|- bgcolor="#CCCCFF"
| Home team
| Home team score
| Away team
| Away team score
| Venue
| Crowd
| Date
|- bgcolor="#FFFFFF"
| 
| 9.11 (65)
| 
| 14.19 (103)
| Western Oval
| 12,839
| 1 September 1979
|- bgcolor="#FFFFFF"
| 
| 8.15 (63)
| 
| 18.14 (122)
| Windy Hill
| 22,589
| 1 September 1979
|- bgcolor="#FFFFFF"
| 
| 23.16 (154)
| 
| 15.13 (103)
| Victoria Park
| 27,206
| 1 September 1979
|- bgcolor="#FFFFFF"
| 
| 23.16 (154)
| 
| 17.19 (121)
| Princes Park
| 24,479
| 1 September 1979
|- bgcolor="#FFFFFF"
| 
| 16.16 (112)
| 
| 15.17 (107)
| Kardinia Park
| 21,801
| 1 September 1979
|- bgcolor="#FFFFFF"
| 
| 21.18 (144)
| 
| 9.11 (65)
| VFL Park
| 20,571
| 1 September 1979

Ladder

Finals

Elimination final

|- bgcolor="#CCCCFF"
| Home team
| Score
| Away team
| Score
| Venue
| Crowd
| Date
|- bgcolor="#FFFFFF"
| 
| 17.22 (124)
| 
| 5.13 (43)
| VFL Park
| 49,470
| 8 September

Qualifying final

|- bgcolor="#CCCCFF"
| Home team
| Score
| Away team
| Score
| Venue
| Crowd
| Date
|- bgcolor="#FFFFFF"
| 
| 9.28 (82)
| 
| 18.13 (121)
| MCG
| 84,660
| 8 September
|- bgcolor="#FFFFFF"

Semi finals

|- bgcolor="#CCCCFF"
| Home team
| Score
| Away team
| Score
| Venue
| Crowd
| Date
|- bgcolor="#FFFFFF"
| 
| 16.20 (116)
| 
| 12.22 (94)
| MCG
| 87,139
| 13 September
|- bgcolor="#FFFFFF"
| 
| 15.21 (111)
| 
| 11.7 (73)
| VFL Park
| 69,142
| 15 September

Preliminary final

|- bgcolor="#CCCCFF"
| Home team
| Score
| Away team
| Score
| Venue
| Crowd
| Date
|- bgcolor="#FFFFFF"
| 
| 13.17 (95)
| 
| 18.14 (122)
| VFL Park
| 73,380
| 22 September

Grand final

Carlton defeated Collingwood 11.16 (82) to 11.11 (77), in front of a crowd of 113,545 people at the MCG.

|- bgcolor="#CCCCFF"
| Game
| Home team
| Home team score
| Away team
| Away team score
| Venue
| Crowd
| Date
|- bgcolor="#FFFFFF"
| Grand final
| 
|  11.16 (82)
| 
| 11.11 (77)
| MCG
| 113,545
| 29 September 1979

Awards
 The leading goalkicker was Kelvin Templeton of Footscray with 91 goals
 The Brownlow Medal was won by Peter Moore
North Melbourne 13.14 (92) defeated  9.13 (67) in the grand final, held as a stand-alone night match at VFL Park on Friday, 28 September, before a crowd of 6,047.

Notable events
 The record for greatest winning margin was set twice during 1979.
In Round 4, Collingwood defeated St Kilda by 178 points, breaking the record set sixty years earlier, in the 1919 VFL season by South Melbourne.
Collingwood's new record was broken only three months later in Round 17, when Fitzroy defeated Melbourne by 190 points, a record which has yet to be broken.
 Fitzroy's score of 36.22 (238) in the same game also set the record for highest score in a VFL/AFL game. This beat the record set by Footscray in the 1978 VFL season by twenty-five points, and remained the record until 1992.
 Fitzroy made the finals for the first time since 1960, ending a nineteen-year finals drought.

See also
 McIntyre "final five" system
 List of VFL debuts in 1979

References
 Stephen Rogers and Ashley Brown (1998). Every Game Ever Played. 6th ed. Victoria: Penguin Books.
 1979 Season – AFL Tables

Australian Football League seasons
VFL season